The  is an outdoor theater in Tokyo, Japan's Hibiya Park. There are actually two concert halls; the smaller was erected during the Meiji era, and the larger was first built in the Taishō era.

Notable events
The smaller music hall collapsed during the 1923 Great Kantō earthquake, but was rebuilt.

The large music hall was first built in July 1923. It was closed in 1943 due to the Pacific War, but rebuilt in August 1954. Between 1982 and August 1983 it was completely rebuilt again.

On April 19, 1987, three people were trampled to death as the audience rushed to the stage at the beginning of a concert by Laughin' Nose. On September 20, 1987, Show-Ya held the first Naon no Yaon music festival at the venue. They held it annually for five years until 1991 and revived it for a one-off in 2008. In 2013, Naon no Yaon was fully resurrected in conjunction with the 90th anniversary of Hibiya Open-Air Concert Hall and has been held annually since.

Elephant Kashimashi first performed at Hibiya Open-Air Concert Hall in 1990, and it has become a tradition with them performing at the venue every year since.

In 2018, Kyary Pamyu Pamyu hosted a concert commemorating the venue's 95th anniversary.

References

External links
 
  

Buildings and structures in Chiyoda, Tokyo
Music venues in Tokyo
Music venues completed in 1923
1923 establishments in Japan